Progestogens, also sometimes written progestagens or gestagens, are a class of natural or synthetic steroid hormones that bind to and activate the progesterone receptors (PR). Progesterone is the major and most important progestogen in the body. The progestogens are named for their function in maintaining pregnancy (i.e., progestational), although they are also present at other phases of the estrous and menstrual cycles.

The progestogens are one of three types of sex hormones, the others being estrogens like estradiol and androgens/anabolic steroids like testosterone. In addition, they are one of the five major classes of steroid hormones, the others being the androgens, estrogens, glucocorticoids, and mineralocorticoids, as well as the neurosteroids. All endogenous progestogens are characterized by their basic 21-carbon skeleton, called a pregnane skeleton (C21). In similar manner, the estrogens possess an estrane skeleton (C18), and androgens, an androstane skeleton (C19).

The terms progesterone, progestogen, and progestin are mistakenly used interchangeably both in the scientific literature and in clinical settings. Progestins are synthetic progestogens and are used in medicine. Major examples of progestins include the 17α-hydroxyprogesterone derivative medroxyprogesterone acetate and the 19-nortestosterone derivative norethisterone. The progestins are structural analogues of progesterone and have progestogenic activity similarly, but differ from progesterone in their pharmacological properties in various ways. 

In addition to their roles as natural hormones, progestogens are used as medications, for instance in menopausal hormone therapy and transgender hormone therapy for transgender women; for information on progestogens as medications, see the progesterone (medication) and progestogen (medication) articles.

Types and examples
The most important progestogen in the body is progesterone (P4). Other endogenous progestogens, with varying degrees of progestogenic activity, include 16α-hydroxyprogesterone (16α-OHP), 17α-hydroxyprogesterone (17α-OHP) (very weak), 20α-dihydroprogesterone (20α-DHP), 20β-dihydroprogesterone (20β-DHP), 5α-dihydroprogesterone (5α-DHP), 5β-dihydroprogesterone (5β-DHP) (very weak), 3β-dihydroprogesterone (3β-DHP), 11-deoxycorticosterone (DOC), and 5α-dihydrodeoxycorticosterone (5α-DHDOC). They are all metabolites of progesterone, lying downstream of progesterone in terms of biosynthesis.

Biological function
The major tissues affected by progestogens include the uterus, vagina, cervix, breasts, testes, and brain. The main biological role of progestogens in the body is in the female reproductive system, and the male reproductive system, with involvement in regulation of the menstrual cycle, maintenance of pregnancy, and preparation of the mammary glands for lactation and breastfeeding following parturition in women; in men progesterone affects spermiogenesis, sperm capacitation, and testosterone synthesis. Progestogens also have effects in other parts of the body. Unlike estrogens, progestogens have little or no role in feminization.

Biochemistry

Biosynthesis

Progesterone is produced from cholesterol with pregnenolone as a metabolic intermediate. In the first step in the steroidogenic pathway, cholesterol is converted into pregnenolone, which serves as the precursor to the progestogens progesterone and 17α-hydroxyprogesterone. These progestogens, along with another steroid, 17α-hydroxypregnenolone, are the precursors of all other endogenous steroids, including the androgens, estrogens, glucocorticoids, mineralocorticoids, and neurosteroids. Thus, many tissues producing steroids, including the adrenal glands, testes, and ovaries, produce progestogens.

In some tissues, the enzymes required for the final product are not all located in a single cell. For example, in ovarian follicles, cholesterol is converted to androstenedione, an androgen, in the theca cells, which is then further converted into estrogen in the granulosa cells. Fetal adrenal glands also produce pregnenolone in some species, which is converted into progesterone and estrogens by the placenta (see below). In the human, the fetal adrenals produce dehydroepiandrosterone (DHEA) via the pregnenolone pathway.

Ovarian production
Progesterone is the major progestogen produced by the corpus luteum of the ovary in all mammalian species. Luteal cells possess the necessary enzymes to convert cholesterol to pregnenolone, which is subsequently converted into progesterone. Progesterone is highest in the diestrus phase of the estrous cycle.

Placental production
The role of the placenta in progestogen production varies by species. In the sheep, horse, and human, the placenta takes over the majority of progestogen production, whereas in other species the corpus luteum remains the primary source of progestogens. In the sheep and human, progesterone is the major placental progestogen.

The equine placenta produces a variety of progestogens, primarily 5α-dihydroprogesterone and 5α,20α-tetrahydroprogesterone, beginning on day 60. A complete luteo-placental shift occurs by day 120–150.

Chemistry

The endogenous progestogens are naturally occurring pregnane steroids with ketone and/or hydroxyl groups at the C3 and C20 positions.

Medical use

Progestogens, including both progesterone and progestins, are used medically in hormonal birth control, hormone therapy, to treat gynecological disorders, to suppress sex hormone levels for various purposes, and for other indications.

References

Further reading
  (the Women's Health, Osteoporosis, Progestin, Estrogen study)

External links
 
 The Nomenclature of Steroids
 The Million Women Study

Hormones of the hypothalamus-pituitary-gonad axis
Hormones of the hypothalamic-pituitary-prolactin axis
Hormones of the pregnant female
 
Prolactin releasers
Sex hormones